Hossein Abarghouei (born 17 September 1997) is an Iranian football midfielder who currently plays for Iranian football club Oghab Teheran in League 2 in Iran.

Club career

Club career statistics

References

1997 births
Living people
Iranian footballers
Sportspeople from Tehran
Gostaresh Foulad F.C. players
Association football midfielders
21st-century Iranian people